The Bangkok Christian Hospital is one of the oldest general hospitals in Bangkok, Thailand. Situated on Silom Road, Bang Rak District.

History 
The first Christian missionaries arriving in Thailand in 19th century often combined preaching with medical help for local population. They considered medical healing as part of their mission, as Jesus had commanded them to "Heal the Sick".

In 1840 the Presbyterian Mission was established in Bangkok and expanded its offices over the country for evangelism together with the healing mission. Initially, clinics were set up which gradually developed into better equipped hospitals.

After the Second World War, the American Presbyterian Mission and the Church of Christ in Thailand purchased a land between Silom Road and Surawong Road with several wooden buildings. After renovation, the buildings were officially inaugurated as the Bangkok Christian Hospital in 1949.

A new Outpatient Department of the Hospital was opened in 1957 with dentistry, laboratory, and pharmacy facilities along with a chapel. A few years later, an operating building (1961) and the Inpatient Department (1965) was added.
 
In the 1970s, an office building in honour of the "Church of Christ in Thailand", was constructed on Surawong Road, and the 13-storey "Mo Bradley Building", named after the pioneer missionary and doctor Dr. Dan Beach Bradley in Thailand, was completed in 1981.

Mission 
At present The Bangkok Christian Hospital has special centers (International Refractive Center, Skin care & laser Center, Health Screening Center, Dental Care Center) and specialized departments (internal medicine, ophthalmology, ear, nose and throat, obstetrics and gynecology, pediatrics, orthopedics, surgery, radiology, anesthesiology).

Besides medical care it provides pastoral care with its same name division.

The Hospital considered to be good and much cheaper, than other same level hospitals by expatriate community in Thailand.

External links 
Official page of the Bangkok Christian Hospital

References

Hospitals in Bangkok
Hospitals established in 1949
1949 establishments in Thailand
Private hospitals in Thailand
Bang Rak district